Chemical tanks are storage containers for chemicals widely used within the chemical industry. They come in a variety of sizes and shapes, and are used for static storage, processing, mixing, and transport of both raw materials and finished chemical products.

Definition
A chemical tank-vessel is of necessity designed for a specific chemical, as all chemicals have variable corrosion potentials there are no, one size fits all. The chemical and application parameters should design tank-vessel, the following is a "tip of the iceberg" view of what goes into defining a Chemical storage tank.

Design

A. The Chemical tank design is critical to a properly functioning long term chemical storage vessel / tank. 

Maintaining control of the chemical, is all science and consists of selecting the appropriate tank materials, chemical resistance being the number one priority. 

B. The Chemical tank will of necessity be made of a material as resistant to the chemical being stored as design and economics allow.

C. The design will further integrate the mechanical parameters (pressure and temperature, erosive and corrosive potentials) of the application, within the designated life of the vessel.

D. Chemical Compatibility, your Chemical provider has chemical resistance information you will need. The chemical provider may assist in providing details of what tank / vessel materials, gasket and plumbing materials are suitable for your chemical.

E. Typically, the chemical manufacturer will produce a chemical profile and information report known as a MSDS (Material Safety Data Sheet). This report is provided by all USA chemical manufacturers or distributors and should be the starting point for the design of your chemical tank / vessel design.

This MSDS report further provides essential safety data on how the chemical may effect / harm people and how you should react if you come in contact with the chemical. Many chemicals have an associated health risk with potentially lethal short and long term effects.

F. Chemical vessels/tanks/containers design will be impacted by many considerations, heat, cold, vacuum, pressure, exothermic reactivity and the inherent aggressive nature of the chemical (acids  - caustic, etc). Consideration in design, of these physics and chemical effects will impact the tank/vessels viability as an appropriate container. 

(Example: Loss of the heating system required to prevent a liquid chemical from freezing: this failure removes access to the process use of the chemical, thus shutting down your process, back-up design considerations should be integrated where economics allow.)

G. There are short-term and long-term goals associated with the engineering and specification for a chemical tank / container / vessel. While economic considerations are a factor, the design of chemical storage containers and how the chemistry may impact the environment is crucial. 

H. Secondary containment is a back up strategy to mitigate potential failure of the primary container / tank / vessel... the typical profile of a vessel with secondary containment is a primary tank / vessel with an exterior vessel shell encompassing the primary vessel with at least 100% plus capacity. Tanks / Vessels Secondary are available in polyethylene, fiberglass and metal materials. 

Secondary containment tank systems are suggested for all aggressive chemicals.

References

NACE - National Association of Corrosion Engineers
NACD - National Association of Chemical Distributors
AICHE - American Institute Of Chemical Engineers
ASME - American Society of Mechanical Engineers

Chemical equipment